Rui Pereira (born 24 March 1956) was a Portuguese Minister of Internal Administration (Ministro da Administração Interna). He took office on 17 May 2007 and ended service in 2011. Before that he was a Constitutional Court judge.

External links
Profile at the Ministry of Internal Administration 
 
27 November 2009 Accident involving Secretary of State  

1956 births
Living people
Government ministers of Portugal
Socialist Party (Portugal) politicians
20th-century Portuguese judges